Samuel R. "Chip" Delany (born April 1, 1942) is an American writer and literary critic. His work includes fiction (especially science fiction), memoir, criticism, and essays on science fiction, literature, sexuality, and society. His fiction includes Babel-17, The Einstein Intersection (winners of the Nebula Award for 1966 and 1967, respectively); Nova, Dhalgren, the Return to Nevèrÿon series, and Through the Valley of the Nest of Spiders. His nonfiction includes Times Square Red, Times Square Blue, About Writing, and eight books of essays. After winning four Nebula awards and two Hugo Awards over the course of his career, Delany was inducted in 2002 into the Science Fiction and Fantasy Hall of Fame.

From January 1975 to May 2015, he was a professor of English, Comparative Literature, and/or Creative Writing at SUNY Buffalo, SUNY Albany, the University of Massachusetts Amherst, and Temple University. 

In 1997 he won the Kessler Award, and in 2010 he won the third J. Lloyd Eaton Lifetime Achievement Award in Science Fiction from the academic Eaton Science Fiction Conference at UCR Libraries. The Science Fiction Writers of America named him its 30th SFWA Grand Master in 2013, and in 2016, he was inducted into the New York State Writers Hall of Fame. Delany received the 2021 Anisfield-Wolf Lifetime Achievement Award.

Early life

Samuel Ray Delany, Jr. was born on April 1, 1942, and raised in Harlem. His mother, Margaret Carey (Boyd) Delany (1916–1995), was a clerk in the New York Public Library system. His father, Samuel Ray Delany Sr. (1906–1960), ran the Levy & Delany Funeral Home on 7th Avenue in Harlem, from 1938 until his death in 1960. The family lived in the top two floors of a three-story private house between five- and six-story Harlem apartment buildings. 

Delany was born into an accomplished and ambitious family. His grandfather, Henry Beard Delany (1858—1928), was born into slavery, but after emancipation became educated, a priest and the first black bishop of the Episcopal Church. Civil rights pioneers Sadie and Bessie Delany were among his paternal aunts. (He drew from their lives as the basis for characters Elsie and Corry in "Atlantis: Model 1924", the opening novella in his semi-autobiographical collection Atlantis: Three Tales.) Other notable family members include his aunt, Harlem Renaissance poet Clarissa Scott Delany, and his uncle, judge Hubert Thomas Delany.

Delany attended the private Dalton School and, from 1951 through 1956, spent summers at Camp Woodland in Phoenicia, New York. He studied at the merit-based Bronx High School of Science, during which he was selected to attend Camp Rising Sun, the Louis August Jonas Foundation's international summer scholarship program. Delany's first published short story, "Salt", appeared in Dynamo, Bronx Science's literary magazine, in 1960.

Delany's father died from lung cancer in October 1960. The following year in August 1961, Delany married poet/translator Marilyn Hacker, and the couple settled in New York's East Village neighborhood at 629 East 5th Street. Hacker was working as an assistant editor at Ace Books, and her intervention helped Delany become a published science fiction author by the age of 20. He had finished writing that first novel (The Jewels of Aptor) while 19, shortly after dropping out of the City College of New York after one semester.

Career 
His next work was the trilogy The Fall of the Towers, followed by The Ballad of Beta-2 and Babel-17; he described his writing in this period, and his marriage to Hacker, in his memoir The Motion of Light in Water. In 1966, while Hacker remained in New York, Delany took a five-month trip to France, England, Italy, Greece, and Turkey. During this period, he wrote The Einstein Intersection. He drew on these locales in several works, including Nova and the short stories "Aye, and Gomorrah" and "Dog in a Fisherman's Net". These works received critical praise: Algis Budrys called Delany a genius and poet and listed him with J. G. Ballard, Brian W. Aldiss, and Roger Zelazny as "an earthshaking new kind" of writer,
while Judith Merril labeled him "TNT (The New Thing)". Babel-17 and The Einstein Intersection won the Nebula Award for Best Novel in 1966 and 1967, respectively.

"The Star-Pit", Delany's first professional short story, was published by Frederick Pohl in the February 1967 issue of Worlds of Tomorrow, and he placed three more in other magazines that year. In 1968, he published four more short stories (including "Time Considered as a Helix of Semi-Precious Stones", winner of the Hugo Award for Best Short Story in 1970) and Nova. This was published by Doubleday, marking Delany's departure from Ace; it was his last science fiction novel until Dhalgren in 1975.

Weeks after Delany's return, he and Hacker began to live separately. Delany played and lived communally for five months on the Lower East Side with the Heavenly Breakfast, a folk-rock band whose other members were Susan Schweers, Steven Greenbaum (aka Wiseman), and Bert Lee (later a founding member of the Central Park Sheiks). Delany wrote a memoir of his experiences with the band and communal life, which was eventually published as Heavenly Breakfast (1979). After he and Hacker briefly came together again, she moved to San Francisco. On New Year's Eve in 1968, Delany joined her; they then moved to London. In the summer of 1971 Delany returned to New York, where he lived at the Albert Hotel in Greenwich Village.

In 1972, Delany directed a short film entitled The Orchid (originally titled The Science Fiction Film in the Latter Twentieth Century), produced by Barbara Wise. Shot in 16mm with color and sound, the production also employed David Wise, Adolfas Mekas, and was scored by John Herbert McDowell. That November, Delany was a visiting writer at Wesleyan University's Center for the Humanities. 

That year, Delany wrote two issues of the comic book Wonder Woman, during a controversial period when the lead character abandoned her superpowers and became a secret agent. Delany scripted issues #202 and #203 of the series. He was initially supposed to write a six-issue story arc that would culminate in a battle over an abortion clinic, but the story arc was canceled after Gloria Steinem led a lobbying effort protesting the removal of Wonder Woman's powers, a change predating Delany's involvement. Scholar Ann Matsuuchi concluded that Steinem's feedback was "conveniently used as an excuse" by DC management.

From December 1972 to December 1974, Delany and Hacker lived in Marylebone, London. During this period, Delany began working with sexual themes in earnest and wrote two pornographic works, Equinox (originally published as The Tides of Lust), and Hogg, which was unpublishable at the time due to its transgressive content; it did not find print until 1995.

Delany's eleventh novel, Dhalgren, was published in 1975 to both literary acclaim (from both inside and outside the science fiction community) and derision (mostly from within the community). It sold more than one million copies. After a lengthy exchange of letters with Leslie Fiedler, Delany returned to the United States at Fiedler's behest to teach at the University at Buffalo as Visiting Butler Professor of English for the spring 1975 semester. That summer he returned to New York City. 

Though he published two more major science fiction novels (Triton and Stars in My Pocket Like Grains of Sand) in the decade following Dhalgren, Delany began to work in fantasy and science fiction criticism. Beginning with The Jewel-Hinged Jaw (1977), a collection of critical essays that applied then-nascent literary theory to science fiction studies, he published several books of criticism, interviews, and essays. He was also a visiting fellow at the University of Wisconsin–Milwaukee in 1977 and the University at Albany in 1978. His main literary project through the late 1970s and 1980s was Return to Nevèrÿon, a four-volume series of sword and sorcery tales. 

In 1987, Delany was a visiting fellow at Cornell University. The next year, he became a professor of comparative literature at the University of Massachusetts Amherst. He held this post for 11 years, before spending a year and a half as an English professor at the University at Buffalo.

Delany's works in the 1990s included They Fly at Çiron, a re-written and expanded version of an unpublished short story he had written in 1962, and his last novel in either the science fiction or fantasy genres for many years. He also published his novel The Mad Man and several essay collections, including  Times Square Red, Times Square Blue (1999), a pair of essays in which Delany drew on personal experience to examine the relationship between the effort to redevelop Times Square and the public sex lives of working-class men in New York City. Delany received the Bill Whitehead Award for Lifetime Achievement from Publishing Triangle in 1993; he has described this as the award of which he is proudest.

After an invited stay at the artist's community Yaddo, he moved to the English Department of Temple University in January 2001, where he taught until his retirement in April 2015. In 2007, his novel Dark Reflections was a winner of the Stonewall Book Award. That same year Delany was the subject of a documentary film, The Polymath, or, The Life and Opinions of Samuel R. Delany, Gentleman, directed by Fred Barney Taylor. The film debuted on April 25 at the 2007 Tribeca Film Festival, and in 2008, it tied for Jury Award for Best Documentary at the International Philadelphia Lesbian and Gay Film Festival. Also in 2007, Delany was the April "calendar boy" in the "Legends of the Village" calendar put out by Village Care of New York. 

In 2010, Delany was one of five judges (along with Andrei Codrescu, Sabina Murray, Joanna Scott and Carolyn See) for the National Book Awards fiction category.

His science fiction novel Through the Valley of the Nest of Spiders was published by Magnus Books on his birthday in 2012. In 2013 he received the Brudner Prize from Yale University, for his contributions to gay literature. The same year, his comic book writer friend and planned literary executor, Robert Morales, passed away. He served as Critical Inquiry Visiting Professor at the University of Chicago during the winter quarter of 2014. In 2015, the year Delany retired from teaching at Temple University, the Caribbean Philosophical Association awarded him its Nicolás Guillén Lifetime Achievement Award.  

Since 2018, his archive has been housed at the Beinecke Library at Yale, where it is currently being organized. Till then, his papers were housed at the Howard Gotlieb Archival Research Center.

Personal life
As a child, Delany envied children with nicknames. He took one for himself on the first day of a new summer camp, Camp Woodland, at the age of 11, by answering "Everybody calls me Chip" when asked his name. Decades later, Frederik Pohl called him "a person who is never addressed by his friends as Sam, Samuel or any other variant of the name his parents gave him."

Delany's name is one of the most misspelled in science fiction, having been misspelled on over 60 occasions in reviews. Bravard and Peplow (1984), pp. 69–75. His publisher Doubleday misspelled his name on the title page of Driftglass, as did the organizers of Balticon in 1982 where Delany was guest of honor.

Delany has identified as gay since adolescence. However, some observers have described him as bisexual due to his complicated 19-year marriage with poet/translator Marilyn Hacker, who was aware of Delany's orientation and has identified as a lesbian since their divorce. 

In 1991, he entered a committed, nonexclusive relationship with Dennis Rickett, previously a homeless book vendor. Their courtship is chronicled in the graphic memoir Bread and Wine: An Erotic Tale of New York (1999), a collaboration with the writer and artist Mia Wolff.

Delany is an atheist.

Themes

Recurring themes in Delany's work include mythology, memory, language, sexuality, and perception. Class, position in society, and the ability to move from one social stratum to another are motifs that were touched on in his earlier work and became more significant in both his later fiction and non-fiction. Many of Delany's later (mid-1980s and beyond) works have bodies of water (mostly oceans and rivers) as a common theme, as mentioned by Delany in The Polymath. Though not a theme, coffee, more than any other beverage, is mentioned significantly and often in many of Delany's fictions.

Writing itself (both prose and poetry) is also a repeated theme: several of his characters — Geo in The Jewels of Aptor, Vol Nonik in The Fall of the Towers, Rydra Wong in Babel-17, Ni Ty Lee in Empire Star, Katin Crawford in Nova, the Kid, Ernest Newboy, and William in Dhalgren, Arnold Hawley in Dark Reflections, John Marr and Timothy Hasler in The Mad Man, and Osudh in Phallos – are writers or poets of some sort.

Delany also makes use of repeated imagery: several characters (Hogg, The Kid (or Kidd) in Dhalgren, and the sensory-syrynx player, the Mouse, in Nova; Roger in "We .. move on a rigorous line") are known for wearing only one shoe; and nail biting along with rough, calloused (and sometimes veiny) hands as characteristics are given to individuals in a number of his fictions. Names are sometimes reused: "Bellona" is the name of a city in both Dhalgren and Triton, "Denny" is a character in both Dhalgren and Hogg (which were written almost concurrently despite being published two decades apart; and there is a Danny in "We ... move on a rigorous line"), and the name "Hawk" is used for five different characters in four separate stories – Hogg, the story "Time Considered as a Helix of Semi-Precious Stones" and the novella "The Einstein Intersection", and the short story "Cage of Brass", where a character called Pig also appears.

Jewels, reflection, and refraction – not just the imagery but reflection and refraction of text and concepts – are also strong themes and metaphors in Delany's work. Titles such as The Jewels of Aptor, The Jewel-Hinged Jaw, "Time Considered as a Helix of Semi-Precious Stones", Driftglass, and Dark Reflections, along with the optic chain of prisms, mirrors, and lenses worn by several characters in Dhalgren, are a few examples of this; as in "We (...) move on a rigorous line" a ring is nearly obsessively described at every twist and turn of the plot. Reflection and refraction in narrative are explored in Dhalgren and take center stage in his Return to Nevèrÿon series.

Following the 1968 publication of Nova, there was not only a large gap in Delany's published work (after releasing eight novels and a novella between 1962 and 1968, his published output virtually stopped until 1973), there was also a notable addition to the themes found in the stories published after that time. It was at this point that Delany began dealing with sexual themes to an extent rarely equaled in serious writing. Dhalgren and Stars in My Pocket Like Grains of Sand include several sexually explicit passages, and several of his books such as Equinox (originally published as The Tides of Lust, a title that Delany does not endorse), The Mad Man, Hogg and Phallos can be considered pornography, a label Delany himself endorses.

Novels such as Triton and the thousand-plus pages making up his four-volume Return to Nevèrÿon series explored in detail how sexuality and sexual attitudes relate to the socioeconomic underpinnings of a primitive – or, in Triton'''s case, futuristic – society.
Even in works with no science fiction or fantasy content to speak of, such as Atlantis: Three Tales, The Mad Man, and Hogg, Delany pursued these questions by creating vivid pictures of New York and other American cities, now in the Jazz Age, now in the first decade of the AIDS epidemic, New York private schools in the 1950s, as well as Greece and Europe in the 1960s, and – in Hogg – generalized small-town America. Phallos details the quest for happiness and security by a gay man from the island of Syracuse in the second-century reign of the Emperor Hadrian. Dark Reflections is a contemporary novel, dealing with themes of repression, old age, and the writer's unrewarded life.

Writer and academic C. Riley Snorton has addressed Triton's thematic engagement with gender, sexual, and racial difference and how their accommodations are instrumentalized in the state and institutional maintenance of social relations. Despite the novel's infinite number of subject positions and identities available through technological intervention, Snorton argues that Delany's proliferation of identities "take place within the context of increasing technologically determined biocentrism, where bodies are shaped into categories-cum-cartographies of (human) life, as determined by socially agreed-upon and scientifically mapped genetic routes." Triton questions social and political imperatives towards anti-normativity insofar that these projects do not challenge but actually reify the constrictive categories of the human. In his book Afro-Fabulations, Tavia Nyong'o makes a similar argument in his analysis of "The Einstein Intersection". Citing Delany as a queer theorist, Nyong'o highlights the novella's "extended study of the enduring power of norms, written during the precise moment—'the 1960s'—when antinormative, anti-systemic movements in the United States and worldwide were at their peak." Like Triton, "The Einstein Intersection" features characters that exist across a range of differences across gender, sexuality, and ability. This proliferation of identities "takes place within a concerted effort to sustain a gendered social order and to deliver a stable reproductive futurity through language" in the Lo society's caging of the non-functional "kages" who are denied language and care. Both Nyong'o and Snorton connect Delany's work with Sylvia Wynter's "genres of being human," underscoring Delany's sustained thematic engagement with difference, normativity, and their potential subversions or reifications, and placing him as an important interlocutor in the fields of queer theory and black studies.The Mad Man, Phallos, and Dark Reflections are linked in minor ways. The beast mentioned at the beginning of The Mad Man graces the cover of Phallos.

Delany has also published seven books of literary criticism, with an emphasis on issues in science fiction and other paraliterary genres, comparative literature, and queer studies. He has commented that he believes that to omit the sexual practices that he portrays in his writing would limit the dialogue children and adults can have about it themselves, and that this lack of knowledge can be fatal.

Festschrifts
 Stories for Chip: A Tribute to Samuel R. Delany (2015), edited by SF and fantastic fiction writer Nisi Shawl, and published by author and Rosarium Publishing founder, Bill Campbell. With essays and short fiction contributions from writers including Kim Stanley Robinson, Eileen Gunn, Vincent Czyz, and Michael Swanwick.

 Awards and recognition 
1985: Pilgrim Award, presented by the Science Fiction Research Association for Lifetime Achievement in the field of science fiction scholarship.
1997: David R. Kessler award for LGBTQ Studies at CLAGS: The Center for LGBTQ Studies
2002: Inducted into the Science Fiction and Fantasy Hall of Fame.
2010: J. Lloyd Eaton Lifetime Achievement Award in Science Fiction from the academic Eaton Science Fiction Conference at UCR Libraries.
2013: Science Fiction Writers of America named him its 30th SFWA Grand Master
2016: Inducted into the New York State Writers Hall of Fame. 
2021: Sir Arthur Clarke Imagination in Service to Society Award for Outstanding Contributions to Fiction, Criticism and Essays on Science Fiction, Literature and Society by the Arthur C. Clarke Foundation. 
2021: Anisfield-Wolf Lifetime Achievement Award.
2022: World Fantasy Award, Lifetime Achievement
2022: Lambda Literary Award, LGBTQ Erotica

In 2022, Delany was featured in the PBS television documentary series Articulate.

Works

Fiction

Novels

Return to Nevèrÿon series

Short stories

Comics/graphic novels
 Wonder Woman, 1972
 Empire, art by Howard V. Chaykin, 1978
 “Seven Moons’ Light Casts Complex Shadows” in Epic Illustrated #2, art by Howard Chaykin, pages 67–74, June 1980
 Bread & Wine: An Erotic Tale of New York, art by Mia Wolff, introduction by Alan Moore, 1999

Anthologies
 Quark/1 (1970) (edited with Marilyn Hacker) 
 Quark/2 (1971) (edited with Marilyn Hacker) 
 Quark/3 (1971) (edited with Marilyn Hacker) 
 Quark/4 (1971) (edited with Marilyn Hacker) 
 Nebula Winners 13 (1980)

Nonfiction

Critical works
 The Jewel-hinged Jaw: Notes on the Language of Science Fiction (Dragon Press, 1977; Wesleyan University Press revised edition 2009, with an introduction by Matthew Cheney)
 The American Shore: Meditations on a Tale of Science Fiction (Dragon Press, 1978; Wesleyan University Press 2014, with an introduction by Matthew Cheney)
 Starboard Wine: More Notes on the Language of Science Fiction (Dragon Press, 1984; Wesleyan University Press, 2012, with an introduction by Matthew Cheney)
 Wagner/Artaud: A Play of 19th and 20th Century Critical Fictions (Ansatz Press, 1988) 
 The Straits of Messina (1989), 
 Silent Interviews (1995), 
 Longer Views (1996) with an introduction by Kenneth R. James, 
 "Racism and Science Fiction" (1998), New York Review of Science Fiction, Issue 120.
 Shorter Views (1999), 
 About Writing (2005), 
 Conversations with Samuel R. Delany (2009), edited by Carl Freedman, University of Mississippi Press.
 Occasional Views, Volume 1: "More About Writing" and Other Essays (Wesleyan University Press, 2015). 
 Occasional Views, Volume 2: "The Gamble" and Other Essays (Wesleyan University Press, 2021). 
 DUETS: Frederick Weston & Samuel R. Delany in Conversation (Visual AIDS, 2021) 

Memoirs and letters
 Heavenly Breakfast (1979), a memoir of a New York City commune during the so-called Summer of Love, 
 The Motion of Light in Water (1988), a memoir of his experiences as a young gay science fiction writer; winner of the Hugo Award, 
 Times Square Red, Times Square Blue (NYU Press, 1999; 2019, 20th anniversary edition with foreword by Robert Reid-Pharr), a discussion of changes in social and sexual interaction in New York's Times Square, ; 
 Bread and Wine: An Erotic Tale of New York (1999), an autobiographical comic drawn by Mia Wolff with an introduction by Alan Moore, 
 1984: Selected Letters (2000) with an introduction by Kenneth R. James, 
 In Search of Silence: The Journals of Samuel R. Delany. Volume 1, 1957-1969 (2017), edited and with an introduction by Kenneth R. James, . 2018 Locus Award Finalist (non-fiction) 
 Letters from Amherst: Five Narrative Letters (Wesleyan University Press, 2019), with foreword by Nalo Hopkinson, 

Introductions
 The Adventures of Alyx, by Joanna Russ
 We Who Are About To..., by Joanna Russ
 Black Gay Man by Robert Reid-Pharr
 Burning Sky, Selected Stories, by Rachel Pollack
 Conjuring Black Funk: Notes on Culture, Sexuality, and Spirituality, Volume 1 by Herukhuti
 The Cosmic Rape, by Theodore Sturgeon
 Glory Road, by Robert A. Heinlein
 Green Lantern co-starring Green Arrow #1, by Dennis O'Neil, Neal Adams, Gil Kane (Paperback Library, 1972)
 Microcosmic God, by Theodore Sturgeon
 The Magic: (October 1961-October 1967) Ten Tales by Roger Zelazny, selected and introduced by Samuel R. Delany 
 Masters of the Pit, by Michael Moorcock
 Nebula Winners 13, edited by Samuel R. Delany
 A Reader's Guide to Science Fiction, by Baird Searles, Martin Last, Beth Meacham, and Michael Franklin; foreword by Samuel R. Delany
 The Sandman: A Game of You, by Neil Gaiman
 Shade: An Anthology of Fiction by Gay Men of African Descent'', edited by Charles Rowell and Bruce Morrow

See also
 LGBT themes in speculative fiction

Explanatory notes

References

Citations

General sources

External links

 Delany's official website
 Samuel R. Delany Information
 Delany bibliography
 
 
 
 
 
 Interview with Samuel R. Delany in Big Other
 Samuel R. Delany Papers. James Weldon Johnson Collection in the Yale Collection of American Literature, Beinecke Rare Book and Manuscript Library.
 Sci-Fi Legend Samuel R. Delany Doesn't Play Favorites (2017 interview)
Samuel R. Delany papers at Special Collections, University of Delaware Library

By Delany 
 Delany biography written by Delany under his nom de plume K. Leslie Steiner
 Errata for all of Delany's novels, approved by the author
 
 
 

1942 births
20th-century American novelists
20th-century American short story writers
21st-century American non-fiction writers
21st-century American novelists
21st-century American short story writers
African-American atheists
African-American novelists
African-American short story writers
Afrofuturist writers
American anti-capitalists
American atheists
American comics writers
American erotica writers
American literary critics
American male non-fiction writers
American male novelists
American male short story writers
American memoirists
American psychological fiction writers
American science fiction writers
BDSM writers
Black speculative fiction authors
The Bronx High School of Science alumni
Camp Rising Sun alumni
Constructed language creators
Dalton School alumni
Delany family
Gay academics
American gay writers
Hugo Award-winning writers
Inkpot Award winners
LGBT African Americans
LGBT comics creators
Gay memoirists
American LGBT novelists
LGBT people from New York (state)
Living people
Nebula Award winners
Novelists from Massachusetts
Novelists from New York (state)
Novelists from Pennsylvania
Queer theorists
Science fiction critics
Science fiction editors
Science Fiction Hall of Fame inductees
SFWA Grand Masters
Temple University faculty
University at Buffalo alumni
University at Buffalo faculty
University of Massachusetts Amherst faculty
Wesleyan University people
Writers from Philadelphia
20th-century American male writers
21st-century American male writers